Nature Communications is a peer-reviewed, open access, scientific journal published by Nature Portfolio since 2010. It is a multidisciplinary journal and it covers the natural sciences, including physics, chemistry, earth sciences, medicine, and biology. The journal has editorial offices in London, Berlin, New York City, and Shanghai.

The founding editor-in-chief was Lesley Anson, followed by Joerg Heber, Magdalena Skipper, and Elisa De Ranieri. As of 2022, the editors are Nathalie Le Bot for health and clinical sciences, Stephane Larochelle for biological sciences, Enda Bergin for chemistry and biotechnology, and Prabhjot Saini for physics and earth sciences.
Starting October 2014, the journal only accepted submissions from authors willing to pay an article processing charge. Until the end of 2015, part of the published submissions were only available to subscribers. In January 2016, all content became freely accessible.

Starting from 2017, the journal offers a deposition service to authors for preprints of articles "under consideration" as part of the submission process.

Abstracting and indexing
The journal is abstracted and indexed in:

According to the Journal Citation Reports, the journal has a 2021 impact factor of 17.690.

Subjournals
In 2017, the creation of three "subjournals" under the Communications brand was announced: Communications Biology, Communications Chemistry, and Communications Physics. In 2020, several additional Communications journals were established: Communications Materials in 2020, Communications Earth & Environment in 2020, Communications Medicine in 2021, and Communications Engineering in 2022.

These open-access journals offer a lower publication fee than Nature Communications, reflecting their more specialist remits. Manuscripts rejected by Nature Publishing Group journals can choose to transfer the manuscript together with reviewers' reports to the Communications-branded journals via an automated transfer service. Alternatively, authors may choose to request a fresh review.

See also
Nature
Scientific Reports
Science Advances

References

External links

Nature Research academic journals
Multidisciplinary scientific journals
Open access journals
Publications established in 2010
English-language journals
Creative Commons-licensed journals
Continuous journals